Charles Anson Steele (born June 22, 1964) is a former American football center who played for the Detroit Lions of the National Football League (NFL). He played college football at University of California.

References

Living people
1964 births
California Golden Bears football players
Detroit Lions players
Players of American football from California
National Football League replacement players